João Magueijo (born 1967) is a Portuguese cosmologist and professor in theoretical physics at Imperial College London. He is a pioneer of the varying speed of light (VSL) theory.

Education and career 
João Magueijo studied physics at the University of Lisbon. He undertook graduate work and Ph.D. at Cambridge University. He was awarded a research fellowship at St John's College, Cambridge. He has been a faculty member at Princeton and Cambridge and is currently a professor at Imperial College London where he teaches undergraduates General Relativity and postgraduates Advanced General Relativity.

This would explain the horizon problem (since distant regions of the expanding universe would have had time to interact and homogenize their properties) and is presented as an alternative to the more mainstream theory of cosmic inflation.

Magueijo discusses his personal struggles pursuing VSL in his 2003 book, Faster Than The Speed of Light, The Story of a Scientific Speculation. He was associated with a misunderstanding over priority concerning VSL with John Moffat. He was also the host of the Science Channel special João Magueijo's Big Bang, which premiered on 13 May 2008.

In 2009, he published A Brilliant Darkness, an account of the life and science of vanished physicist Ettore Majorana.

In 2014, he published Bifes Mal Passados, describing his observations on the United Kingdom. In this book, Magueijo described British culture as one of the "most rotten societies in the world", and wrote that "When you visit English homes, or the toilets at schools or in student lodgings, they are all so disgusting that even my grandmother's poultry cage is cleaner". British people were described as "unrestrained wild beasts". The book was only published in Portugal, where it sold 20,000 copies.

João Magueijo has been interviewed by Morgan Freeman in season 2 of Through the Wormhole.

See also 
 Doubly special relativity

Books 
 Bifes Mal Passados: Passeios e outras catástrofes por terras de Sua Majestade, Gradiva, 2014, 
 A Brilliant Darkness: The Extraordinary Life and Disappearance of Ettore Majorana, the Troubled Genius of the Nuclear Age, Basic Books, 2009/2010, 
 Faster than the Speed of Light: The Story of a Scientific Speculation, Basic Books, 2003,

References 
 
 
 )

External links 

 João Magueijo's Big Bang on the Science Channel
 New theory on light weighs heavily on scientists on The Christian Science Monitor

Cosmologists
Portuguese physicists
Science writers
1967 births
Living people
Academics of Imperial College London
20th-century astronomers
Princeton University faculty
Academics of the University of Cambridge
People from Évora
University of Lisbon alumni